Pontiac Township High School (PTHS) is a public high school for grades 9-12 in Pontiac, Illinois, United States.
PTHS offers over 100 courses, including nine AP classes.
It is associated with the Livingston Area Career Center to provide additional career opportunities for students.
The first class of 24 students graduated in 1898.

It is a part of Pontiac Township High School District #90.

Athletics
PTHS is a member of the Illini Prairie Conference.

Sports include:
Fall
Cheerleading
Cross Country (G) 
Cross Country (B)
American football
Golf (G) 
Golf (B) 
Swimming (G) 
Tennis (G)
Volleyball

Winter
Basketball (G) 
Basketball (B) 
Cheerleading
Swimming (B) 
Wrestling

Spring
Baseball
Softball
Tennis (B) 
Track (G) 
Track (B)

The Indians won the 1993 3A state championship and became 5A runner-up in the 2002 football campaign. Since the 1993 Season the Indians have won 10 consecutive cornbelt conference championships and 15 consecutive playoff appearances.

Pontiac hosts the United States' oldest high school basketball Holiday Tournament.

See also
 Pontiac Elementary School District 429

References

External links
Pontiac K-12 site

Educational institutions established in 1898
1898 establishments in Illinois
Public high schools in Illinois
Pontiac, Illinois
Schools in Livingston County, Illinois
School districts in Illinois